Carlos Antonio (or António) is an Italian, Spanish, and Portuguese name. Carlos Antonio may refer to:

Sport 

 Carlos Aguiar (born Carlos Antonio Aguiar Burgos), Uruguayan former footballer
 Carlos Ascues (born Carlos Antonio Ascues Ávila), Peruvian professional footballer
 Carlos Gutiérrez Barriga (born Carlos Antonio Gutiérrez Barriga), Mexican former footballer
 Carlinhos (born Carlos Antonio de Souza Júnior), Brazilian professional football player
 Carlos Castro Caputo (born Carlos Antonio Castro Caputo), Spanish retired footballer 
 Carlos Cañizales (born Carlos Antonio Cañizales), Venezuelan professional boxer 
 Carlos Muñoz Cobo (born Carlos Antonio Muñoz Cobo), known simply as Carlos, is a Spanish retired footballer who played as a striker. 
 Carlos Diaz (pitcher), (born Carlos Antonio Diaz; 1958 – 2015), American Major League Baseball relief pitcher
 Carlos Dinis (born Carlos António Dinis), Angolan basketball head coach
 Carlos Antônio Ferreira de Sousa, Brazilian footballer
 Carlos López Cortéz (born Carlos Antonio López Cortéz) is a Mexican footballer 
 Carlos Gomes (footballer, born 1932), (born Carlos António do Carmo Costa Gomes; 1932 - 2005) Portuguese footballer
 Carlos Huerta (born Carlos Antonio Huerta), American former college and professional football player 
 Carlos Antonio Meléndez, retired Salvadoran football (soccer) player
 Carlos Antonio Mereles, Paraguayan footballer 
 Carlos Muñoz (Ecuadorian footballer) (born Carlos Antonio Muñoz Martínez; 1964 – 1993) Ecuadorian football
 Carlo Piccio (born Juan Carlos Antonio Piccio), Filipino former swimmer
 Carlos Ponce (baseball) (born Carlos Antonio Ponce Diaz), Puerto Rican former Major League Baseball first baseman
 Carlos Antônio Ribeiro de Oliveira, Brazilian striker. 
 Carlos Rodón (born Carlos Antonio Rodón), American professional baseball pitcher for the Chicago White Sox of Major League Baseball (MLB).
 Carlos Toro (born Carlos Antonio Toro Coronado), Chilean football goalkeeper
 Carlos Padilla Velásquez (born Carlos Antonio Padilla Velásquez; 1934 – 2014), Honduran footballer
 Carlos Salom (born Carlos Antonio Salom Zulema), Argentine-born Palestinian footballer. 
 Carlos Simões (born Carlos António Fonseca Simőes), former Portuguese footballer
 Carlos Suárez (boxer) (born Carlos Antonio Suárez AKA The Magician), American born Trinidadian boxer who competed at the 2012 Summer Olympics

Politics 
 Carlos Herrera Araluce (born Carlos Antonio Herrera Araluce) Mexican politician
 Carlos Bettini (born Carlos Antonio Bautista Bettini Francese), Argentinian businessman, politician, and diplomat who was the Argentinian ambassador to Spain and Andorra
 Carlos Antonio Carrillo (1783–1852), Governor of Alta California from 1837 to 1838. 
 Carlos Romero Barceló (born Carlos Antonio Romero Barceló), the fifth Governor of Puerto Rico
 Carlos António Fernandes, Angolan minister for transport from 1987 to 1990. 
 Carlos Antonio López (1792–1862), president of Paraguay from 1841 to 1862. 
 Carlos Antonio Mendoza (1856–1916), Panamanian politician
 Carlos Romero Deschamps (born Carlos Antonio Romero Deschamps), Mexican politician affiliated with the PRI
 Carlos Antonio (Zambian politician), see List of members of the National Assembly of Zambia (2011–16)

Others 
 Carlos Castro (journalist) (born Carlos António Castro; 1945–2011), Portuguese television personality and journalist 
 Carlos Chávez (born Carlos Antonio de Padua Chávez y Ramírez; 1899–1978), Mexican composer, conductor,
 Carlos Antonio Lozada (born 1961), former Colombian guerrilla member of the Revolutionary Armed Forces of Colombia (FARC).
 Carlos Antonio López, Paraguay, district in the Itapúa Department of Paraguay.
 Carlos Antônio Napion (1757–1814), engineer and general in the Portuguese army in Brazil
 Carlos Antônio da Rocha Paranhos, Ambassador Extraordinary and Plenipotentiary of the Federative Republic of Brazil to the Russian Federation. 
 Anthony Pini (born Carlos Antonio Pini; 1902–1989), Argentinian cellist, soloist, orchestral section leader and chamber musician
 Carlos A. Santos-Viola (1912–1994), architect in the Philippines.